†Archaeopragidae is an extinct family of paleozoic molluscs of uncertain position (Gastropoda or Monoplacophora).

Taxonomy 
The taxonomy of the Gastropoda by Bouchet & Rocroi, 2005 categorizes Archaeopragidae in the superfamilia Archinacelloidea within the 
Paleozoic molluscs of uncertain systematic position. This family has no subfamilies.

Genera 
Genera in the family Archaeopragidae include:
 Archaeopraga Horný, 1963 - type genus of the family Archaeopragidae

References